Farmers Weekly is a magazine aimed at the British farming industry. It provides news; business features; a weekly digest of facts and figures about British, European and world agriculture; and livestock, arable and machinery sections with reports on technical developments, farm sales and analysis of prices.

History and profile
The first issue of The Farmers Weekly was on 22 June 1934, costing 2d. It claimed to be a newspaper of the soil and aimed to increase agricultural production in the United Kingdom. It was acquired by Edward George Warris Hulton in 1937. The magazine is published weekly on Fridays, typically 51 times per year. Farmers Weekly has published books including Farmhouse Fare (1935) and Home Made Country Wines (1955), both consisting of recipes contributed by readers of the magazine.

In the 1930s, Farmers Weekly average circulation per issue was 100,000 copies. In 2004, it had an average circulation of 77,233; by 2013, this had fallen to 59,328; in 2018, average circulation was 44,023 per issue.

Farmers Weekly Interactive (FWi) is the online home of Farmers Weekly, with 623,231 unique visitors per month visiting the FWi website.

Related events include the Farmers Weekly Awards (which celebrates British agriculture and features influential farmers), Soils In Practice, and Ag Careers Live. The publisher also runs projects including Farmers Apprentice (first launched in 2012 and run bi-annually), the Young Farmers Festival and Britain's Fittest Farmer competition, which was launched in March 2019 and highlights the need for farmers to take time out to focus on their physical health and mental wellbeing.

Farmers Weekly was part of Proagrica, which includes other products such as "Farmplan", "Sirrus" and other precision agriculture software, until its sale to MA Agriculture Limited. Proagrica is owned by Reed Business Information and is based in Sutton in Surrey. In December 2019, RBI announced plans to sell the magazine title, website and related platforms, events and awards to MA Agriculture Limited, part of the Mark Allen Group.

References

External links

Agriculture in the United Kingdom
Agricultural economics
Business magazines published in the United Kingdom
Agricultural magazines
Weekly magazines published in the United Kingdom
Mass media in Surrey
Companies based in Surrey
Magazines established in 1934
RELX
1934 establishments in the United Kingdom